Boop may refer to:

Film and cartoons
 Betty Boop, a cartoon character and cousin of Buzzy
 Buzzy Boop, a cartoon character and cousin of Betty

See also